Svend is a Danish and Norwegian given name that may refer to:

 King Svend
 Svend Aagesen (c.1145–?), Danish historian
 Svend Asmussen (1916–2017), Danish jazz violinist known as "The Fiddling Viking"
 Svend Auken (1943–2009), Danish politician
 Svend Bayer (born 1946), Ugandan-born Danish/English studio potter 
 Svend Bergstein (1941–2014), Danish military officer and politician 
 Svend Bille (1888–1973), Danish stage and film actor
 Svend Borchmann Hersleb (1784–1836), Norwegian professor of theology and politician 
 Svend von Düring (1915–1969), Norwegian actor
 Svend Engedal (1928–2001), Danish-born American soccer goalkeeper
 Svend Foyn (1809–1894), Norwegian sailor
 Svend Frømming (1918–1979), Danish sprint canoer
 Svend Grundtvig (1824–1883), Danish literary historian and ethnographer
 Svend Haugaard (1913–2003), Danish politician
 Svend Erik Hovmand (born 1945), Danish politician representing the Liberal Party (Former tax minister)
 Svend Jacobsen (1906–1986), Danish fencer and Olympic competitor
 Svend Jakobsen (1935–2022), Danish politician
 Svend Aage Jensby (born 1940), Danish politician representing the Liberal Party (Former defence minister)
 Svend Jensen (1905–1979), Danish footballer
 Svend Karlsen (born 1967), Norwegian strongman
 Svend Kornbeck (1869–1933), Danish stage and film actor
 Svend-Erik Kristensen (born 1956), Danish long-distance runner
 Svend Unmack Larsen (1893–1965), Danish politician
 Svend Lomholt (1888–1949), Danish veterinarian and dermatologist 
 Svend Lund (born 1949), Danish handball player and Olympic competitor
 Svend Aage Madsen (born 1939), Danish novelist
 Svend Melsing (1888–1946), Danish actor and theatre director
 Svend Methling (1891–1977), Danish actor and film director
 Svend Munck (1899–1974) Danish fencer and Olympic competitor
 Svend Petersen (1911–1992), Danish-born American author, political researcher and analyst 
 Svend Poulsen (c. 1610–c. 1680), Danish military commander 
 Svend Pri (1945–1983), Danish badminton player 
 Svend Rasmussen Svendsen (1864–1945), Norwegian-born American impressionist artist
 Svend Rathsack (1885–1941), Danish sculptor
 Svend Rindom (1884–1960), Danish screenwriter 
 Svend Robinson (born 1952), Canadian politician and activist for gay rights
 Svend S. Schultz (1913–1998), Danish composer and conductor 
 Svend Adolph Solberg (1831–1890),  Norwegian politician
 Svend-Allan Sørensen (born 1975), Danish conceptual artist and founder of Adressens Forlag
 Svend Wad (1928–2004), Danish boxer and Olympic medalist

Danish masculine given names
Norwegian masculine given names